Liberty Township is one of twelve townships in Delaware County, Indiana. According to the 2010 census, its population was 4,414 and it contained 1,997 housing units.

Liberty Township was established in 1825.

Geography

Cities and towns
 Muncie (east edge)
 Selma

Unincorporated towns
 Hyde Park
 Smithfield
 Woodland Park

Adjacent townships
 Delaware Township (north)
 Monroe Township, Randolph County (east)
 Stoney Creek Township, Randolph County (southeast)
 Perry Township (south)
 Monroe Township (southwest)
 Center Township (west)
 Hamilton Township (northwest)

Major highways
  Indiana State Road 32

Cemeteries
The township contains eight cemeteries: Bortsfield, Freidline, Graham, Mount Tabor, Orr, Sparr, Truitt and White.

Demographics

2020 census
As of the census of 2020,  there were 4,414 people, 1,845 households, and 979 families living in the township.

The median age in the township was 45.9. 1.7% of residents were under the age of 5; 20.9% of residents were under the age of 18; 79.1% were age 18 or older; and 21.8% were age 65 or older. 5.6% of the population were veterans.

The most common language spoken at home was English with 96.4% speaking it at home, 1.5% spoke Spanish at home, 2.0% spoke an Asian or Pacific Islander language at home, and 0.1% spoke another Indo-European language. 1.2% of the population were foreign born.

The median household income in Liberty Township was $49,778, 11.4% less than the median average for the state of Indiana. 14.2% of the population were in poverty, including 14.5% of residents under the age of 18.

References
 
 United States Census Bureau cartographic boundary files

External links

 Indiana Township Association
 United Township Association of Indiana

Townships in Delaware County, Indiana
Townships in Indiana